WLPN-LP, UHF analog channel 61, was a low-power television station licensed to New Orleans, Louisiana, United States. The station was owned by Glenn and Karin Plummer. The channel 61 allocation was formerly used by ABC affiliate WJMR-TV (now Fox affiliate WVUE-DT). In 1989, the station affiliated with Channel America.  The station's license was cancelled on August 17, 2010.

References

Television stations in New Orleans
Television channels and stations established in 1989
1989 establishments in Louisiana
Defunct television stations in the United States
Television channels and stations disestablished in 2010
2010 disestablishments in Louisiana
Defunct mass media in Louisiana